The Al Casey Quartet is an album by guitarist Al Casey which was recorded in 1960 and released on the Moodsville label.

Track listing
 "Blue Moon" (Richard Rodgers, Lorenz Hart) – 4:35
 "These Foolish Things" (Jack Strachey, Eric Maschwitz) – 6:45
 "All Alone" (Irving Berlin) – 5:26
 "Don't Worry About Me" (Rube Bloom, Ted Koehler) – 5:52
 "Dancing in the Dark" (Arthur Schwartz, Howard Dietz) – 4:23
 "I'm Beginning to See the Light" (Duke Ellington, Don George, Johnny Hodges, Harry James) – 4:47
 "A Case of the Blues" (Jim Lewis) – 2:53

Personnel
Al Casey – guitar
Lee Anderson – piano
Jimmy Lewis – bass
Belton Evans – drums

References

Al Casey (jazz guitarist) albums
1960 albums
Moodsville Records albums
Albums recorded at Van Gelder Studio